The 7th Sarasaviya Awards festival (Sinhala: 7වැනි සරසවිය සම්මාන උලෙළ), presented by the Associated Newspapers of Ceylon Limited, was held to honor the best films of 1969 Sinhala cinema on March 7, 1970, at the Colombo New Theater Grounds, Sri Lanka. Minister of Education I. M. R. A. Iriyagolle was the chief guest at the awards night.

The film Binaramalee won the most awards with eight including Best Film.

Awards

References

Sarasaviya Awards
Sarasaviya